Second Christian Church is a historic African-Amefican church located at 401 N. 5th, Columbia, Missouri. It was built in 1927, and is in an eclectic architectural style.  It was added to the National Register of Historic Places  in 1980.

References

Churches on the National Register of Historic Places in Missouri
Churches completed in 1927
Churches in Columbia, Missouri
National Register of Historic Places in Boone County, Missouri
African-American history of Missouri
African-American history in Columbia, Missouri